Milton J. "Milt" Rosenberg (April 15, 1925 – January 9, 2018) was a prominent social psychologist who was professor of psychology at the University of Chicago and was the host of a long-running radio program in Chicago, Illinois.

Rosenberg was awarded the National Humanities Medal in 2008 by President George W. Bush, "for bringing the world of ideas to millions of listeners."

In 1988 the Committee for Skeptical Inquiry (CSICOP) presented Rosenberg the Responsibility in Journalism Award.

Early life
Rosenberg, born in New York City, attended Brooklyn College (BA, 1946), the University of Wisconsin (MA, 1948), and the University of Michigan (PhD, 1953). He began his teaching career as an Instructor in Psychology at the University of Michigan (1952–54).

Education career
Rosenberg was a professor emeritus of psychology at the University of Chicago, where he served as the director of the doctoral program in Social and Organizational Psychology. Prior to coming to Chicago in the mid-1960s, he taught at Yale (1954–61), Ohio State University (1961–63), and Dartmouth College (1963–65). For a brief period Rosenberg served on the staff of the Naval War College, and he has lectured at various other universities both in the United States and abroad.  He served on the Board of Trustees of Chicago's Shimer College in the late 2000s.

Articles
Rosenberg wrote many articles in professional journals and political magazines.  He also wrote, coauthored, or edited a number of books, including: Attitude Organization and Change; Theories of Cognitive Consistency; Domestic Sources of Foreign Policy; Beyond Conflict and Containment: Critical Studies of Military and Foreign Policy; and Vietnam and the Silent Majority. One of his areas of study was cognitive dissonance and attitude change, on which he worked closely with Robert P. Abelson, among others.

Radio show 

From 1973 until December 20, 2012, he hosted WGN Radio's "Extension 720," a two-hour discussion show with one hour reserved for call-ins. The program, which aired Sunday through Thursday (originally Monday through Friday) from 10 p.m. to midnight (an hour later than formerly), dealt with topics ranging from politics to financial investment to entertainment to religion to foreign policy to literature, and, as Milt says, "just about everything except pop psychology and poodle-trimming."

Calling upon journalists, academics, corporate types and just about any and every profession, Extension 720 provided highly varied nightly shows. Some of the programs heard during 2004 were:
Is War Dead?, The Iran Enigma, Crazy Horse and the Wars of the Plains, The Rise and Fall of Communism, The Changing Face of Chicago, The Films of Francis Ford Coppola, Stem Cell Research, A Night at the Opera, Bush's War Cabinet, Shakespeare's Tragedies, The Undergraduate Life, Avoiding Con Artists, Nanotechnology, The Language of the Presidency, Great Gospel Music, Contemporary Russia and The Origin and Descent of Man.

Past guests of note include such political figures as Margaret Thatcher, Jimmy Carter, Henry Kissinger, George Stephanopoulos, George Shultz, Cyrus Vance (and many members of the Senate and House of Representatives). Other interesting public figures who have appeared on the program include Colin Powell, Charlton Heston, William Safire, Bill Murray, William Bennett, Richard Posner, Bob Feller, Betty Friedan, Zbigniew Brzezinski, Cynthia Ozick, Norman Mailer, Mary Higgins Clark, Calvin Trillin, P.D. James, Peggy Noonan, David Brinkley, George Will, Stanley Kurtz, Ron Paul, Gerry Spence, Jim Lehrer, Michael Medved, Carl Sagan, and on and on—virtually a cast of thousands of interesting and significant people.

On September 12, 2001, Neocons Fred & Don Kagan were on Rosenberg's show advocating for a U.S. military invasion of Palestine.

On December 17, 2012, WGN announced that Rosenberg would retire from his daily show on December 20, 2012.  However, although he will no longer be a full-time program host, the station's leaders announced that he would remain a show contributor and have a presence at the station. However, it appears that Rosenberg did not have any continuing relationship with WGN after his forced retirement.

Podcast
In May 2013, Rosenberg began an independent podcast entitled The Milt Rosenberg Show. The podcast website featured Rosenberg doing new free interviews and offering old ones for sale.

Return to radio
In April 2015, Rosenberg returned to radio on WCGO/1590 from Evanston, Illinois, weekday evenings; but in November 2015 WCGO cancelled Rosenberg's program along with the rest of its afternoon lineup.

Death

Rosenberg died in Chicago on January 9, 2018, of complications from pneumonia at the age of 92.  His wife author Marjorie Rosenberg died in 2021.

References

External links

20th-century American Jews
American radio personalities
1925 births
2018 deaths
Scientists from New York City
University of Michigan faculty
Yale University faculty
Ohio State University faculty
Dartmouth College faculty
University of Chicago faculty
Brooklyn College alumni
University of Wisconsin–Madison alumni
University of Michigan alumni
National Humanities Medal recipients
Deaths from pneumonia in Illinois
21st-century American Jews